Eudesmia ruficollis is a moth of the subfamily Arctiinae first described by Edward Donovan in 1798. It is found in Brazil and Argentina.

References

Eudesmia
Moths described in 1798